Graham Noyce (born 18 February 1957) is an English former professional motocross racer. He competed in the Motocross World Championships from 1975 to 1984. Noyce was the 1979 500cc motocross world champion.



Motocross career
Growing up in Fair Oak, Hampshire, England, Noyce was encouraged by his father to start riding motorcycles at the age of 6. He won the British Schoolboy motocross championship at the age of 14 riding a 125cc Zündapp. Noyce left Wyvern County Secondary School at the age of 15 to become an apprentice tool maker for the Rickman brothers, noted British motorcycle frame builders. The Rickman brothers also provided him with a 250cc Montesa on which to compete. 

After winning support races at the 1974 British motocross Grand Prix, Noyce was offered a contract to race for the Maico factory racing team. In 1975, he competed in the British motocross championships as well as selected 125cc world championship Grand Prix races. He finished the season ranked 17th in the 125cc motocross world championship. He moved up to the premier 500cc class in 1976 and won his first Grand Prix race at the British motocross Grand Prix and finished the season ranked a respectable 4th place in the final world championship standings. Despite falling to 8th place in the 1977 world championship, his riding talent earned him a place on the Honda factory racing team for the 1978 season.

In 1979, Noyce claimed the F.I.M. 500cc motocross world championship by defeating a strong field of riders that included his Honda teammate, André Malherbe, as well as Roger De Coster and Gerrit Wolsink riding for Suzuki, Brad Lackey with Kawasaki and Heikki Mikkola with Yamaha. He became the first British rider to win a 500cc motocross world championship since Jeff Smith won the title in 1965.

Noyce continues his involvement in the sport competing in vintage motocross events. He won the over 50 race at Polesworth in 2007 and competed at Farleigh Castle in July 2019.

References

Living people
1957 births
People from the Borough of Eastleigh
British motocross riders
Place of birth missing (living people)